Pterobrycon is a genus of characins found in Colombia and Costa Rica.

Species
There are currently 2 recognized species in this genus:
 Pterobrycon landoni C. H. Eigenmann, 1913
 Pterobrycon myrnae W. A. Bussing, 1974 (Semaphore tetra)

References

Characidae